Ferdinando I de' Medici, Grand Duke of Tuscany (30 July 1549 – 3 February 1609) was Grand Duke of Tuscany from 1587 to 1609, having succeeded his older brother Francesco I.

Early life

Ferdinando was the fifth son (the third surviving at the time of his birth) of Cosimo I de' Medici, Grand Duke of Tuscany, and Eleanor of Toledo, the daughter of Pedro Álvarez de Toledo, Marquis of Villafranca, the Spanish viceroy of the Kingdom of Naples.

He was made a Cardinal in 1562 at the age of 13, but was never ordained into the priesthood. At Rome, he proved an able administrator. He founded the Villa Medici in Rome and acquired many works of art (including the Medici lions), which he then brought back to Florence with him.

Grand Duke

When his brother Francesco I de' Medici, Grand Duke of Tuscany, died in 1587, Ferdinando succeeded as grand duke at the age of 38.

In many ways, Ferdinando was the opposite of his brother who preceded him. Approachable and generous, he set out to rule mildly. He re-established the justice system and was genuinely concerned about the welfare of his subjects. During his reign, Tuscany revived and regained the independence his brother had given up.

Ferdinando fostered commerce and gained great wealth through the Medici banks, which were established in all the major cities of Europe. He enacted an edict of tolerance for Jews and heretics, and Livorno became a haven for Spanish Jews as well as other persecuted foreigners. He established the Medici Oriental Press (Typographia Medicea), which published numerous books in the Arabic script.

He improved the harbour Cosimo I had built and diverted part of the flow of the Arno River into a canal called the Naviglio, which aided commerce between Florence and Pisa. He fostered an irrigation project in the Val di Chiana, which allowed the flatlands around Pisa and Fucecchio and in the Val di Nievole to be cultivated.

The greatest cultural achievement in Florence during Ferdinando's reign was the introduction of opera to Europe.  For the wedding of Ferdinando's niece Marie de' Medici to King Henry IV of France in 1600, his court sponsored a lavish performance of one of the first notable operas, Jacopo Peri's Euridice.

Marriage

For the first two years of his reign, he retained his position as cardinal, but he gave it up in order to marry  Christina of Lorraine in 1589. The couple had a large reception at the Medici Villa in Poggio a Caiano. Christina's dowry was considerably large; it included 600,000 crowns in cash as well as jewellery with a value of 50,000 crowns. Also, the rights of the Duchy of Urbino were transferred to Christina after the death of Queen Catherine de' Medici of France and thus assumed by future Medici rulers.

Foreign policy

Ferdinando's foreign policy attempted to free Tuscany from Spanish domination. After the assassination of Henry III of France in 1589, he supported Henry IV of France in his struggles against the Catholic League. Ferdinando lent Henry money and encouraged him to convert to Catholicism, which he eventually did. Ferdinando also used his influence with Pope Clement VIII to get him to accept Henry's conversion.

Henry showed no appreciation for these favours, and Ferdinando let the relationship cool, maintaining his cherished independence. He supported Philip III of Spain in his campaign in Algeria and Holy Roman Emperor Rudolf II in his against the Turks. For these undertakings, he found it necessary to raise taxes on his subjects. He finally obtained the formal investiture of Siena, which his father had conquered.

Ferdinando strengthened the Tuscan fleet, and it saw victories against pirates on the Barbary coast in 1607 and against a superior Turkish fleet the following year.

He also dreamed of a small African empire, and then considered the possibility of a colony in Brazil. A few months before his death, Ferdinando organised an expedition in 1608 under the command of Captain Robert Thornton to northern Brazil and the Amazon river in order to create a colony.

Issue
 Cosimo II (1590–1621), who succeeded as Grand Duke of Tuscany; he married Maria Maddalena of Austria and had issue
 Eleonora  (1591–1617), died unmarried
 Catherine (1593–1629), married Ferdinando Gonzaga, Duke of Mantua, later Governor of Siena
 Francesco (1594–1614), died unmarried
 Carlo (1595–1666), died unmarried
 Filippino (1598–1602), died unmarried
 Lorenzo (1599–1648), died unmarried
 Maria Maddalena (1600–1633), died unmarried
 Claudia (1604–1648), married first to Federico della Rovere and had issue, then to Leopold V, Archduke of Austria, and had issue.

Ancestors

References

External links

 
 
 

1549 births
1609 deaths
Ferdinando 1
Ferdinando 1
Burials at San Lorenzo, Florence
16th-century Italian cardinals
16th-century Italian nobility
17th-century Italian nobility